Najam Sheraz (Urdu: نجم شیراز) is a Pakistani pop singer and songwriter.

Early life
Najam Sheraz was born in Multan, Pakistan, on 2 August 1969. 

He has played professional cricket at first-class level with the likes of Inzamam-ul-Haq and Waqar Younis. 

He graduated from the University of Engineering and Technology, Lahore in civil engineering. 

He formed his first band with his elder brothers Booby and Joji called Brother Rhythm in 1987. 

His first Urdu nasheed Na Tera Khuda Koi Aur Hai was very popular.

Awards

References

External links
 

1969 births
Living people
People from Multan
Pakistani pop singers
Pakistani playback singers
Pakistani civil engineers
University of Engineering and Technology, Lahore alumni
Musicians from Lahore
Punjabi people